Donnellson is a village in Montgomery and Bond counties, Illinois, United States. The population was 153 as of the 2020 census.

History
Donnellson was laid out ca. 1858. The village's name honors Thomas Carson Donnell, an early settler. Donnellson was incorporated as a village in 1897.

Geography

Demographics

As of the 2020 census there were 153 people, 70 households, and 44 families residing in the village. The racial makeup of the village was 87.58% White, 1.31% Asian, and 11.11% from two or more races. Hispanic or Latino of any race were 1.31% of the population.

There were 70 households, out of which 12.86% had children under the age of 18 living with them, 24.29% were married couples living together, 14.29% had a female householder with no husband present, and 37.14% were non-families. 35.71% of all households were made up of individuals, and 20.00% had someone living alone who was 65 years of age or older. The average household size was 1.82 and the average family size was 1.63.

The village's age distribution consisted of 7.9% under the age of 18, 1.8% from 18 to 24, 26.3% from 25 to 44, 35% from 45 to 64, and 28.9% who were 65 years of age or older. The median age was 54.0 years. For every 100 females, there were 96.6 males. For every 100 females age 18 and over, there were 105.9 males.

Males had a median income of $50,313 versus $34,375 for females. The per capita income for the village was $18,109. About 47.7% of families and 49.1% of the population were below the poverty line, including 55.6% of those under age 18 and 36.4% of those age 65 or over.

References

External links
Donnellson Illinois, Historical Society of Montgomery County Illinois

Villages in Bond County, Illinois
Villages in Illinois
Villages in Montgomery County, Illinois
Populated places established in 1897
1858 establishments in Illinois
Populated places established in 1858